Isoetes, commonly known as the quillworts, is a genus of lycopod. It is the only living genus in the family Isoetaceae and order Isoetales. There are currently 192 recognized species, with a cosmopolitan distribution mostly in aquatic habitats but with the individual species often scarce to rare. Some botanists split the genus, separating two South American species into the genus Stylites, although molecular data place these species among other species of Isoetes, so that Stylites does not warrant taxonomic recognition. Species of Isoetes virtually identical to modern forms have existed since the Jurassic epoch.

The name of the genus may also be spelled Isoëtes. The diaeresis (two dots over the e) indicates that the o and the e are to be pronounced in two distinct syllables. Including this in print is optional; either spelling (Isoetes or Isoëtes) is correct.

Description

Quillworts are mostly aquatic or semi-aquatic in clear ponds and slow-moving streams, though several (e.g. I. butleri, I. histrix and I. nuttallii) grow on wet ground that dries out in the summer. The quillworts are spore-producing plants and highly reliant on water dispersion. Quillworts have different ways to spread their spores based on the environment. Quillwort leaves are hollow and quill-like, with a minute ligule at the base of the upper surface. arising from a central corm. The sporangia are sunk deeply in the leaf bases. Each leaf will either have many small spores or fewer large spores. Both types of leaf are found on each plant. Only 4% of total biomass, the tips of the leaves, is chlorophyllous.

I. tegetiformans) form spreading mats. This swollen base also contains male and female sporangia, protected by a thin, transparent covering (velum), which is used diagnostically to help identify quillwort species. They are heterosporous. Quillwort species are very difficult to distinguish by general appearance. The best way to identify them is by examining their megaspores under a microscope. Moreover, habitat, texture, spore size, and velum provide features that distinguish Isoëtes taxa. They also possess a vestigial form of secondary growth in the basal portions of its cormlike stem, an indication that they evolved from larger ancestors.

Biochemistry and genetics
Quillworts use Crassulacean acid metabolism (CAM) for carbon fixation. Some aquatic species don't have stomata and the leaves have a thick cuticle which prevents CO2 uptake, a task that is performed by their hollow roots instead, which absorb CO2 from the sediment. This has been studied extensively in Isoetes andicola. CAM is normally considered an adaptation to life in arid environments to prevent water loss with the plants opening their stomata at night rather than in the heat of the day. This allows CO2 to enter and minimises water loss. As mostly submerged aquatic plants, quillworts do not lack water and the use of CAM is considered to avoid competition with other aquatic plants for CO2 during daytime.

The first detailed quillwort genome sequence, of I. taiwanensis, showed that there were differences from CAM in terrestrial plants. CAM involves the enzyme phosphoenolpyruvate carboxylase (PEPC) and plants have two forms of the enzyme. One is normally involved in photosynthesis and the other in central metabolism. From the genome sequence, it appears that in quillworts, both forms are involved in photosynthesis. In addition, the time of day of the peak abundance of some of the components of CAM was different from terrestrial plants. These fundamental differences in biochemistry suggests that CAM in quillworts is probably another example of convergent evolution of CAM during the more than 300 million years since the genus diverged from other plants. However, they may also be because of differences between life in water and in the air. The genome sequence also provided two insights into its structure. First, genes and repeated non-coding regions were fairly evenly distributed across all the chromosomes. This is similar to genomes of other non-seed plants, but different from the seed plants (angiosperms) where there are distinctly more genes at the ends of chromosomes. Secondly, there was also evidence that the whole genome had been duplicated in the ancient past.

Taxonomy
Compared to other genera, Isoetes is poorly known. The first critical monograph on their taxonomy, written by Norma Etta Pfeiffer, was published in 1922 and remained a standard reference into the twenty-first century. Even after studies with cytology, scanning electron microscopy, and chromatography, species are difficult to identify and their phylogeny is disputed. Vegetative characteristics commonly used to distinguish other genera, such as leaf length, rigidity, color, or shape are variable and depend on the habitat. Most classification systems for Isoetes rely on spore characteristics, which make species identification nearly impossible without microscopy.

Reproduction

Overview 
Like all land plants, Isoetes undergoes an alternation of generations between a diploid sporophyte stage and a sexual haploid gametophyte stage. However, the dominance of one stage over the other has shifted over time. The development of vascular tissue and subsequent diversification of land plants coincides with the increased dominance of the sporophyte and reduction of the gametophyte. Isoetes, as members of the Lycopodiopsida class, are part of the oldest extant lineage that reflects this shift to a sporophyte dominant lifecycle. In closely related lineages, such as the extinct Lepidodendron, spores were dispersed by the sporophyte through large collections of sporangia called strobili for wind-based spore dispersal. However, Isoetes are small heterosporous semi-aquatic plants, with different reproductive needs and challenges than large tree-like land plants.

Description
Like the rest of the Lycopodiopsida class, Isoetes reproduces with spores. Among the lycophytes, both Isoetes and the Selaginellaceae (spikemosses) are heterosporous, while the remaining lycophyte family Lycopodiaceae (clubmosses) is homosporous. As heterosporous plants, fertile Isoetes sporophytes produce megaspores and microspores, which develop in the megasporangia and microsporangia. These spores are highly ornate and are the primary way by which species are identified, although no one functional purpose of the intricate surface patterns is agreed upon. The megasporangia occur within the outermost microphylls (single-veined leaves) of the plant while the microsporangia are found in the innermost microphylls. This pattern of development is hypothesized to improve the dispersal of the heavier megaspore. These spores then germinate and divide into mega- and micro- gametophytes. The microgametophytes have antheridia, which in turn produce sperm. The megagametophytes have archegonia, which produce egg cells. Fertilization takes place when the motile sperm from a microgametophyte locates the archegonia of a megagametophyte and swims inside to fertilize the egg.

Outside of heterospory, a distinguishing feature of Isoetes (and Selaginella) from other pteridophytes, is that their gametophytes grow inside the spores. This means that the gametophytes never leave the protection of the spore that disperses them, cracking the perispore (the outer layer of the spore) just enough to allow the passage of gametes. This is fundamentally different from ferns, where the gametophyte is a photosynthetic plant exposed to the elements of its environment. However, containment creates a separate problem for Isoetes, which is that the gametophytes have no way to acquire energy on their own. Isoetes sporophytes solve this problem by provisioning starches and other nutrients to the spores as an energy reserve for the eventual gametophytes. Although not a homologous process, this provisioning is somewhat analogous to other modes of offspring resource investment in seed-plants, such as fruits and seeds. The extent to which resources provisioned to the megaspore also support the growth of the new sporophyte is unknown in Isoetes.

Dispersal 
Spore dispersal occurs primarily in water (hydrochory) but may also occur via adherence to animals (zoochory) and as a result of ingestion (endozoochory). These are among the reasons suggested for the ornamentations of the spore, with some authors demonstrating that certain patterns seem well-adapted for sticking to relevant animals like waterfowl. Another critical element of dispersal is the observation that in some species of Isoetes, the outer coat of megaspores have pockets that trap microspores, a condition known as synaptospory. Typically, heterospory means that colonization and long-dispersal are more difficult due to the fact that a single spore cannot grow a bisexual gametophyte and thus cannot establish a new population from a single spore as can happen in homosporous ferns. Isoetes may mitigate this issue via microspores stuck to megaspores, greatly increasing the possibility of successful fertilization upon dispersal.

Species
, Plants of the World Online accepted the following extant species:

Isoetes abyssinica Chiov.
Isoetes acadiensis Kott
Isoetes aemulans J.P.Roux
Isoetes aequinoctialis Welw. ex A.Br.
Isoetes alcalophila S.Halloy
Isoetes alpina Kirk – New Zealand quillwort
Isoetes alstonii C.F.Reed & Verdc.
Isoetes × altonharvillii Musselman
Isoetes amazonica A.Br.
Isoetes anatolica Prada & Rolleri
Isoetes andicola (Amstutz) L.D.Gómez
Isoetes andina Spruce ex Hook.
Isoetes appalachiana D.F.Brunt. & D.M.Britton – Appalachian quillwort
Isoetes araucaniana Macluf & Hickey
Isoetes asiatica (Makino) Makino
Isoetes attenuata C.R.Marsden & Chinnock
Isoetes australis S.Williams – Australian quillwort
Isoetes azorica Durieu
Isoetes baculata Hickey & H.P.Fuchs
Isoetes biafrana Alston
Isoetes bischlerae H.P.Fuchs
Isoetes bolanderi Engelm. – Bolander's quillwort
Isoetes boliviensis U.Weber
Isoetes boomii Luebke – Boom's quillwort; southeast US
Isoetes boryana Durieu
Isoetes boyacensis H.P.Fuchs
Isoetes bradei Herter
Isoetes brasiliensis H.P.Fuchs
Isoetes brevicula E.R.L.Johnson
Isoetes × brittonii D.F.Brunt. & W.C.Taylor
Isoetes × bruntonii Knepper & Musselman
Isoetes butleri Engelm. – Butler's quillwort
Isoetes cangae J.B.S.Pereira, Salino & Stützel
Isoetes capensis 
Isoetes × carltaylorii Musselman
Isoetes caroli E.R.L.Johnson – Brazil
Isoetes caroliniana (A.A.Eaton) Luebke is regarded by Plants of the World Online as a synonym of Isoetes valida, but other sources treat it as a valid species
Isoetes chubutiana Hickey, Macluf & W.C.Taylor
Isoetes coreana Y.H.Chung & H.K.Choi is a synonym of Isoetes sinensis var. coreana
Isoetes coromandelina L.f.
Isoetes creussensis Lazare & S.Riba
Isoetes cristata C.R.Marsden & Chinnock
Isoetes cubana Engelm.
Isoetes delilei (Bory) Rothm.
Isoetes dispora Hickey
Isoetes dixitii Shende
Isoetes × dodgei A.A.Eaton
Isoetes drummondii A.Braun – Drummond's quillwort
Isoetes durieui Bory – Durieu's quillwort
Isoetes × eatonii R.Dodge – Eaton's quillwort
Isoetes echinospora Durieu
Isoetes × echtuckerii D.F.Brunt. & D.M.Britton
Isoetes ecuadoriensis Aspl.
Isoetes ekmanii U.Weber
Isoetes elatior A.Braun
Isoetes eludens J.P.Roux, Hopper & Rhian J.Sm. – elusive quillwort
Isoetes engelmannii A.Braun – Engelmann's quillwort
Isoetes escondidensis S.Halloy
Isoetes eshbaughii Hickey & H.P.Fuchs
Isoetes × fairbrothersii J.D.Montgom. & W.C.Taylor
Isoetes flaccida Shuttlew. – southern quillwort
Isoetes fluitans M.I.Romero
Isoetes × foveolata A.A.Eaton
Isoetes fuliginosa R.L.Small & Hickey
Isoetes fuscomarginata H.P.Fuchs
Isoetes gardneriana Kunze
Isoetes georgiana Luebke – Georgia quillwort; southeast US
Isoetes giessii Launert
Isoetes gigantea U.Weber
Isoetes × gopalkrishnae S.K.Singh, P.K.Shukla & N.K.Dubey
Isoetes graniticola D.F.Brunt.
Isoetes gunnii A.Braun
Isoetes gymnocarpa (Gennari) A.Braun
Isoetes habbemensis Alston
Isoetes hallasanensis H.K.Choi, Ch.Kim & J.Jung – Korea
Isoetes × harveyi A.A.Eaton (syn. Isoetes × heterospora Eaton)
Isoetes haussknechtii Troìa & Greuter
Isoetes hawaiiensis W.C.Taylor & W.H.Wagner
Isoetes heldreichii Wettst.
Isoetes hemivelata R.L.Small & Hickey
Isoetes × herb-wagneri W.C.Taylor
Isoetes herzogii U.Weber
Isoetes hewitsonii Hickey
Isoetes × hickeyi W.C.Taylor & Luebke
Isoetes hieronymi U.Weber
Isoetes histrix Bory – land quillwort; Channel Islands
Isoetes hopei J.R.Croft
Isoetes howellii Engelm. – Howell's quillwort
Isoetes humilior A.Braun
Isoetes hyemalis D.F.Brunt. is a synonym of Isoetes riparia var. amesii
Isoetes hypsophila Hand.-Mazz.
Isoetes inflata E.R.L.Johnson
Isoetes jaegeri Pitot
Isoetes jamaicensis Hickey
Isoetes japonica A.Braun – Japan
Isoetes × jeffreyi D.M.Britton & D.F.Brunt.
Isoetes jejuensis H.K.Choi, Ch.Kim & J.Jung
Isoetes junciformis D.F.Brunt. & D.M.Britton – rush quillwort; southeast US
Isoetes karstenii A.Braun
Isoetes killipii C.V.Morton
Isoetes kirkii A.Braun
Isoetes labri-draconis N.R.Crouch
Isoetes lacustris L. – lake quillwort
Isoetes laosiensis C.Kim & H.K.Choi
Isoetes lechleri Mett.
Isoetes libanotica Musselman, Bolin & R.D.Bray
Isoetes lithophila N.Pfeiff.
Isoetes longissima Bory
Isoetes louisianensis Thieret – Louisiana quillwort
Isoetes luetzelburgii U.Weber
Isoetes macrospora 
Isoetes malinverniana Ces. & De Not.
Isoetes × marensis D.M.Britton & D.F.Brunt.
Isoetes maritima Underw. – maritime quillwort
Isoetes martii A.Braun
Isoetes mattaponica Musselman & W.C.Taylor
Isoetes maxima Hickey, Macluf & Link-Pérez
Isoetes melanopoda J.Gay & Durieu – black-footed quillwort
Isoetes melanospora Engelm. – black-spored quillwort
Isoetes melanotheca Alston
Isoetes mexicana Underw. (syn. Isoetes montezumae A.A.Eaton)
Isoetes × michinokuana M.Takamiya, Mits.Watan. & K.Ono
Isoetes microvela D.F.Brunt.
Isoetes minima A.A.Eaton
Isoetes mississippiensis S.W.Leonard, W.C.Taylor, Musselman & R.D.Bray
Isoetes mongerensis E.R.L.Johnson – Monger quillwort
Isoetes montana U.Weber
Isoetes mourabaptistae J.B.S.Pereira, P.G.Windisch, Lorscheitt. & Labiak
Isoetes muelleri A.Braun – Mueller's quillwort
Isoetes naipiana P.G.Windisch, Lorscheitt. & Nervo
Isoetes nana J.B.S.Pereira
Isoetes neoguineensis 
Isoetes nigritiana A.Br.
Isoetes nigroreticulata Verdc.
Isoetes × novae-angliae D.F.Brunt. & D.M.Britton
Isoetes novogranadensis H.P.Fuchs
Isoetes nuttallii A.Braun – Nuttall's quillwort
Isoetes occidentalis L.F.Hend.
Isoetes olympica A.Br.
Isoetes orcuttii A.A.Eaton - Orcutt's quillwort 
Isoetes organensis U.Weber
Isoetes orientalis Hong Liu & Q.F.Wang
Isoetes ovata N.Pfeiff.
Isoetes pallida Hickey
Isoetes palmeri H.P.Fuchs
Isoetes panamensis Maxon & C.V.Morton
Isoetes × paratunica D.F.Brunt., Mochalova & A.A.Bobrov
Isoetes parvula Hickey
Isoetes pedersenii H.P.Fuchs ex E.I.Meza & Macluf
Isoetes perralderiana Durieu & Letourn. ex Milde
Isoetes perrieriana Iversen
Isoetes philippinensis Merr. & L.M.Perry
Isoetes phrygia Hausskn.
Isoetes piedmontana (N.Pfeiff.) C.F.Reed – Piedmont quillwort
Isoetes pitotii Alston
Isoetes precocia R.L.Small & Hickey
Isoetes pringlei Underw.
Isoetes prototypus D.M.Britton & Goltz
Isoetes pseudojaponica M.Takamiya, Mits.Watan. & K.Ono
Isoetes × pseudotruncata D.M.Britton & D.F.Brunt.
Isoetes pusilla C.R.Marsden & Chinnock
Isoetes quiririensis J.B.S.Pereira & Labiak
Isoetes ramboi Herter
Isoetes riparia Engelm. ex A.Braun
Isoetes sabatina Troìa & Azzella
Isoetes saccharata Engelm.
Isoetes sahyadrii Mahab.
Isoetes saracochensis Hickey
Isoetes savatieri Franch.
Isoetes schweinfurthii A.Br.
Isoetes sehnemii H.P.Fuchs
Isoetes septentrionalis D.F.Brunt.
Isoetes serracarajensis J.B.S.Pereira, Salino & Stützel
Isoetes setacea Lam.
Isoetes sinensis T.C.Palmer – China
Isoetes smithii H.P.Fuchs
Isoetes spannagelii H.P.Fuchs
Isoetes spinulospora C.Jermy & Schelpe
Isoetes stellenbossiensis A.V.Duthie
Isoetes stephanseniae A.V.Duthie
Isoetes stevensii J.R.Croft
Isoetes storkii T.C.Palmer
Isoetes taiwanensis De Vol – Taiwan
Isoetes tamaulipana Mora-Olivo, A.Mend. & Mart.-Aval. – Tamaulipas, México
Isoetes tegetiformans Rury – mat-forming quillwort
Isoetes tenella Léman ex Desv. – spiny-spore quillwort
Isoetes tennesseensis Luebke & Budke – Tennessee quillwort; southeast US
Isoetes tenuifolia Jermy
Isoetes tenuissima Boreau – French quillwort
Isoetes texana Singhurst, Rushing & W.C.Holmes
Isoetes todaroana Troìa & Raimondo
Isoetes toximontana Musselman & J.P.Roux - green-spored quillwort; South Africa
Isoetes transvaalensis C.Jermy & Schelpe
Isoetes triangula U.Weber
Isoetes tripus A.Braun
Isoetes truncata Clute
Isoetes tuckermanii A.Braun ex Engelm.
Isoetes tuerckheimii Brause
Isoetes udupiensis P.K.Shukla, G.K.Srivast., S.K.Shukla & P.K.Rajagopal
Isoetes ulei U.Weber
Isoetes valida Clute – Carolina or strong quillwort
Isoetes vanensis M.Keskin & G.Zare
Isoetes vermiculata Hickey
Isoetes virginica N.Pfeiff. is a synonym of Isoetes melanopoda subsp. melanopoda
Isoetes viridimontana M.A.Rosenthal & W.C.Taylor – Green Mountain quillwort
Isoetes weberi Herter
Isoetes welwitschii A.Br. ex Kuhn
Isoetes wormaldii Sim
Isoetes yunguiensis Q.F.Wang & W.C.Taylor

Many species, such as the Louisiana quillwort and the mat-forming quillwort, are endangered species. Several species of Isoetes are commonly called Merlin's grass, especially I. lacustris, but also the endangered species I. tegetiformans.

Evolution
Fossilised specimens of I. beestonii have been found in rocks dating to the latest Permian. Quillworts are considered to be the closest extant relatives of the fossil tree Lepidodendron, with which they share some unusual features including the development of both wood and bark, a modified shoot system acting as roots, bipolar growth, and an upright stance. Studies indicates that the Isoetes crown group which exist today evolved from a single lineage in the early Cenozoic.

References

External links

 Checklist of World Ferns, Family Isoetaceae, genus Isoetes; world species list. (143 species)
 Distribution and classification list for world isoetes

 
Lycophyte genera